Abisara aita is a butterfly in the family Riodinidae. It is found on both Sumatra and Borneo. It was first described by British entomologist Lionel de Nicéville in 1893.

References

Butterflies described in 1893
Abisara
Butterflies of Asia